USS Lansdale (DD-766) was scheduled to be a  destroyer in the United States Navy. She was named for Philip Lansdale (1858-1899), a United States Navy officer.

Lansdale was laid down 2 April 1944 by Bethlehem Steel Company, San Francisco, California; launched 20 December 1946; sponsored by Mrs. Ethel S. Lansdale; and delivered 30 December in partially completed status to the 12th Naval District for berthing at Suisun Bay.

Lansdale saw no active service. Her name was struck from the Naval Vessel Register 9 June 1958.

References

 

Cancelled ships of the United States Navy
Ships built in San Francisco
1946 ships
Gearing-class destroyers of the United States Navy